Munz Lakes is a small lake located directly on the San Andreas Fault in the northern Sierra Pelona Mountains, within Los Angeles County, California.

Geography
The lake is one of a series of sag ponds created by active tectonic plate movement of the San Andreas Fault in the area, which also include Elizabeth Lake and Hughes Lake.  They are part of the northern upper Santa Clara River watershed.

History
Munz Lakes receives its name from rancher John Munz, who arrived in the area in 1898.

See also
 
  – related topics
 List of lakes in California

References

External links

Lakes of Los Angeles County, California
Santa Clara River (California)
Sierra Pelona Ridge
Angeles National Forest
Lakes of California
Lakes of Southern California